San Cebrián de Campos is a municipality located in the province of Palencia, Castile and León, Spain. According to the 2004 census (INE), the municipality has a population of 471 inhabitants.

See also
Tierra de Campos

References

Municipalities in the Province of Palencia